Brno central station referendum, 2016, is a municipal referendum on the location of Brno main railway station, in Brno, Moravia, Czech Republic and the way of its future modernisation. Citizens will vote on whether to retain the station at its current location and modernise it, or replace it with a new station at another location. The result of the referendum binds only local government. Nevertheless, it also indirectly affects government organs in the Czech Republic  through the already existing system of contractual obligations. The date of referendum is set on 7 and 8 October 2016, the same day as regional elections.

Background  
Brno Main Railway Station, located directly in the Brno city centre (on the former fortification wall circuit) has been in service since 1838. As time went by, the symmetric and harmonized tram network adjacent to the railway station was developed. The tram network grew along with the city for 157 years. Today, the main railway station borders closely with tram nodes with seven tram lines. Each of them is in half of its route, so there are 14 routes of the tram network. (they are distributed to the structure of city with 8 tracks). Then there are 2 lines of trolleybuses and 8 lines of buses. The majority of the most important city destinations are within comfortable walking distance. About 11,000 inhabitants live within . In the last 20 years, projects have been moving the railway station  out of the city centre.

History 
Ninety years ago the idea of changing the main railway station's location appeared as a reaction of the annual increase of traffic (1923-1924 = + 26%). Since then this idea has weakening alternately, disappeared or reappeared in different circumstances. However, it repeatedly ran into a strong and resolute opposition of experts and the public.

The first local referendum on this question was held in 2004. Local authorities set the date of referendum on 9 October, which means one week before the European parliament elections.¨

The idea of repeating the referendum on the same topic appeared in the beginning of 2013 after the first successful local referendum in city of Pilsen, the same day as Presidential elections. It was motivated by the change of legislation of the code of local referendum, which was in the quorum – 35% instead of the previous 50% turnout is now necessary to make a referendum binding for a local authority.

Legislation 
No legislation on a national referendum has been passed so far. There are just two types of local referendum in the Czech law – municipal referendum and regional referendum. Each type is regulated with a different code. In the case of Brno, the Local Referendum Code is relevant.

Judgements 
On 1 August 2014 the Referendum initiative committee submitted the "Proposal on the holding of a referendum on the Main railway station location" to Brno municipal authority and with 1,531 referendum petition forms containing 21,101 signatures of eligible voters. Fifteen days later, the authority claimed that 5,251 signatures were incorrect (i.e. invalid). The initiative committee considered this statement dubious, arbitrary and obstructive from the side of the public authority. (Standard error rate during signature gathering is around 3%). Therefore, they brought up an action against the authority to the administrative court. After two weeks they submitted another 5,813 signatures. Eventually on 17 October 2014, after two individual judgements, a court passed the judgement 65A 8/2014 - 74  There, the court recognized, on the basis of its own proving, that the number of signatures was already sufficient by 1 September 2014. Thus the referendum should have been declared simultaneously with the municipal elections in October 2014.

Final decision 
After this judgement the proponents proposed that the referendum should be held simultaneously with the next regional elections in October 2016. (PB is authorised to it). The newly elected city representation accepted this proposal on its first gathering on 25 November 2014. The referendum which was originally intended for municipal elections 2014 was postponed to 2016, because the referendum which is held simultaneously with elections has a much bigger chance of achieving sufficient turnout.

See also 
 Stuttgart 21

References

Further reading 
 SMITH, Michael L., Přímá demokracie v praxi: politika místních referend  v České republice, Praha:ISEA - Institut pro sociální a ekonomické analýzy: AV ČR 2007. 
 RIGEL, Filip, Zákon o místním referendu s komentářem a judikaturou. Praha: Leges, 2011. 
 COUNCIL OF EUROPE, Local Referendums: Report, Council of Europe Press, Den Haag 1993. 
 KUŹELEWSKA, Elżbieta, Referendum in the Czech Republic and Slovakia, In: Annales Politologia, Vol 21, No 1 (2014) (Poland) 
 ŠPOK, R., ŘǏHÁČKOVÁ, V., WEISS, T., BARTOVIC, V., DROMARD, J. 2006. Místní referenda v České republice a ve vybraných zemích Evropské unie, Institut EUROPEUM, Praha, pp. 11–50. The ACE Electoral Knowledge Network 2013, aceproject.org/ace-en/topics/es/ese/ese08/ese08a/ ese08a03 [Last accessed 19.12.2013]
 SAPÁKOVÁ, Kristina, The Issue of a Local Referendum on the Example of the Referendum concerning the Position of the Main Train Station in Brno, Theses Masaryk University, Faculty of Law 2015 (Czech - English abstract)
 VOJTECHOVA, Hana, The Role of Local Referenda - Local Referenda in The Czech Republic, Brussels European Commission/Nuclear Research Institute Rez plc, 2009
 KAUFMANN, Bruno, BÜCHI, Rolf, BRAUN, Nadja, (2010) Guidebook to direct democracy in Switzerland and beyond. Marburg IRI. 
 SMITH, Michael L., Voter information and responsiviniess in the local referendum in Brno in: SCHILLER, Theo (ed.), Local Direct Democracy in Europe. Heidelberg, VS Verlag 2011. .

External links 

 Initiative committee website
 City of Brno, Official website
 Europoint (Station change) website
 Train categories

Referendums in the Czech Republic
Regional elections in the Czech Republic
2016 elections in the Czech Republic
2016 in the Czech Republic
Elections in Brno